Viktor Aleksandrovich Tolokonsky (born 27 May 1953 in Novosibirsk) is a Russian politician. He was governor of Krasnoyarsk Krai, Russia from 2014 to 2017 and governor of Novosibirsk Oblast from 2000 to 2010.

Previously, Tolokonsky was the mayor of Novosibirsk, governor of Novosibirsk Oblast and the Presidential Envoy to the Siberian Federal District.

In 1993, he was elected as the head of the Novosibirsk administration, and mayor when the position was established in 1996.  He served until 2000, when he was elected as governor of Novosibirsk Oblast.  On 6 July 2007, Russia's President Vladimir Putin reappointed him for further five-year term.  As a governor, he also had a seat on the  State Council of the Russian Federation.

References

Living people
1st class Active State Councillors of the Russian Federation
Governors of Novosibirsk Oblast
Governors of Krasnoyarsk Krai
1953 births
Mayors of Novosibirsk
United Russia politicians
21st-century Russian politicians
Members of the Federation Council of Russia (1996–2000)
Novosibirsk State University of Economics and Management alumni